Sacramento is an unincorporated community in Phelps County, Nebraska, United States.

History
Sacramento had a post office between 1879 and 1944. The community was likely named after Sacramento, California.

Sacramento was located along the Burlington Railroad.

References

External links 
Historical images of Sacramento – Nebraska Memories

Unincorporated communities in Phelps County, Nebraska
Unincorporated communities in Nebraska